Idol: Jakten på en superstjerne 2003 was the first season of Idol Norway based on the British singing competition Pop Idol. It premiered in January and was aired until May 23, 2003 with Kurt Nilsen winning. A year later he would eventually win World Idol where he competed against 10 Idol winners from other countries.

Finals

Finalists
(ages stated at time of contest)

Elimination Chart

Notes: 
After the first liveshow, where Jeanette ended up in the bottom 2, she was disqualified for being underage.
Due to Jeanette being disqualified, Tone was given another chance to return.

Live show details

Heat 1 (14 February 2003)

Heat 2 (21 February 2003)

Heat 3 (28 February 2003)

Heat 4 (7 March 2003)

Heat 5 (14 March 2003)

Live Show 1 (21 March 2003)
Theme: Your Idol

Live Show 2 (28 March 2003)
Theme: Norwegian Songs

Live Show 3 (4 April 2003)
Theme: 1980s

Live Show 4 (11 April 2003)
Theme: Elton John

Live Show 5 (25 April 2003)
Theme: Disco

Live Show 6 (2 May 2003)
Theme: Big Band

Live Show 7 (9 May 2003)
Theme: Top 20 Hits

Live Show 8: Semi-final (16 May 2003)
Theme: Judge's Choice

Live final (23 May 2003)

References

External links
Profiles of the top 10 finalists

Season 01
2003 Norwegian television seasons